

Margarete Hilferding, born Hönigsberg (June 20, 1871 in Hernals (Vienna)– September 23, 1942 in Maly Trostenets) was an Austrian physician and psychoanalyst. 

Hilferding was the first woman admitted into the Vienna Psychoanalytic Society. Her husband was the Austro-Marxist economist Rudolf Hilferding.

She was murdered in the Holocaust, dying on a train from Theresienstadt to Maly Trostenets.

References

Sources 
 Margarete Hilferding, Geburtenregelung. Erörterungen zum § 144.- Vienna, 1926
 Ilse Korotin, Margarethe Hilferding. In: Gelehrte Frauen, Verlag BMUK, Vienna, 1996
 Martina Gamper: "... so kann ich nicht umhin mich zu wundern, dass nicht mehr Ärztinnen da sind." : die Stellung weiblicher Ärzte im "Roten Wien" (1922–1934). Verlag Österreichische Ärztekammer, 2000
 Sonja Stipsits: Margarete Hönigsberg : aus dem Leben einer Pionierin. Töchter des Hippokrates. Verlag Österreichische Ärztekammer, 2000.
 Eveline List: Mutterliebe und Geburtenkontrolle - Zwischen Psychoanalyse und Sozialismus Mandelbaum Verlag, Vienna, 2006; 
 Balsam, R. (2003), Women of the Wednesday Society: The Presentations of Drs. Hilferding, Spielrein and Hug-Hellmuth. American Imago; Vol 60: 3, Fall 2003, pp. 303–343.

External links 
 Biographie

Austrian women psychologists
Psychodynamic psychotherapy
Austrian Jews who died in the Holocaust
People from Hernals
Theresienstadt Ghetto prisoners
1871 births
1942 deaths
History of psychiatry
Austrian educators
Austrian women educators
Jewish educators
People who died in Maly Trostenets extermination camp
Austrian civilians killed in World War II
Members of the Vienna Psychoanalytic Society